How I Spent My Summer Vacation is a 1997 romantic comedy film, directed by John Fisher. The film stars Deanna Davis and RonReaco Lee, and is Fisher's directorial debut film.

Plot
Perry (Lee) and Stephanie's (Davis) junior year in college has just ended. Though the two have been dating since high school, they both feel that the spark in the relationship is gone, and that their constant bickering, breaking up, and making up has become more like a game. They both decide the best thing to do is to call off the relationship before their senior year, so they can test the waters with other people. Perry begins to date Tammy, a young woman who actually has a boyfriend overseas. While he's very attracted to Tammy (Dixon), he can't really shake his yearning for Stephanie. Eventually Perry tries to reconcile their relationship, and finds that Stephanie might be testing waters of her own.

Cast
 Deanna Dawn Davis — Stephanie
 RonReaco Lee — Perry
 Darren Law — Nolan
 E. Roger Mitchell — Joseph
 Felice Heather Monteith — Helen
 Jade Jenise Dixon — Tammy
 Maisha Dyson — Rhonda
 Maude Bond — Monica
 Sahr Ngaujah — D'Angelo
 T'Erika Jenks — Kim

External links
 
 

1997 films
1997 romantic comedy films
African-American romantic comedy films
1990s English-language films
1990s American films